The 2017–18 George Mason Patriots Men's basketball team represented George Mason University during the 2017–18 NCAA Division I men's basketball season. The season was the 52nd for the program, the third under head coach Dave Paulsen, and the fifth as members of the Atlantic 10 Conference The Patriots played their home games at EagleBank Arena in Fairfax, Virginia. They finished the season 16–17, 9–9 in A-10 play to finish in a four-way tie for fifth place. As the No. 5 seed in the A-10 tournament, they defeated Massachusetts in the second round before losing to Saint Joseph's in the quarterfinals.

Previous season
The Patriots finished the 2016–17 season 20–14, 9–9 in A-10 play to finish in a tie for seventh place. As the No. 7 seed in the A-10 tournament, they defeated Fordham in the second round before losing in the quarterfinals to VCU. They were invited to the College Basketball Invitational where they lost in the first round to Loyola (MD).

Offseason

Departures

2017 recruiting class

Source

Preseason
In a poll of the league's head coaches and select media members at the conference's media day, the Patriots were picked to finish in 10th place in the A-10. Junior guard Otis Livingston II was named to the conference's preseason third team.

Honors and awards 
Atlantic 10 All-Conference 2nd Team
 Otis Livingston II

Roster

Player statistics

Schedule and results

|-
!colspan=12 style=| Non-conference regular season

|-
!colspan=12 style=|A-10 regular season

|-
!colspan=12 style=|A-10 tournament

References

George Mason Patriots men's basketball seasons
George Mason
George Mason men's basketball
George Mason